Best of Rockers 'n' Ballads is a compilation album by the German hard rock band Scorpions, released in 1989. All songs on this album are from their tenure with Mercury Records, from 1979 to 1988, in addition to rare or never-before released material.

Background

The record was released with different track listings in different regions: At all the compilation features several rare or completely unreleased tracks: There are remixes of "Big City Nights", "Lovedrive", "Holiday" and "Is There Anybody There", which were previously unreleased. Also included are two different versions of "Hey You". While the European pressing features a previously unreleased remix of the song, the US and Japanese editions are the only ones featuring the original version, which was released in 1980 as a single. Another rarity was a cover of The Who's "I Can't Explain", which was also included on that same year's Stairway to Heaven/Highway to Hell charity compilation album.
The European CD edition also includes one more rarity: the version of "China White", which features a different solo, a solo that was just released on US editions of Blackout before.

The track listing and individual running times differ between the US, European and Asian editions. While the European pressing features 14 or 15 tracks, the original version of "Hey You" is missing and replaced by a remix. The US and Japanese version just feature twelve tracks and omit the re-recorded version of "Is There Anybody There?" as well as "Another Piece of Meat" and "China White", but it includes the longer, original version of "Hey You". The European edition was re-released with the title The Essential Scorpions in 2003.

Best of Rockers 'n' Ballads reached platinum status in the United States, and is the Scorpions' only compilation album to be certified at least gold by the RIAA there.

Track listing

European edition

US and Japanese edition

Charts

Album

Singles

Sales and certifications

References

Scorpions (band) compilation albums
1989 compilation albums
Mercury Records compilation albums